X Factor was the Icelandic version of the popular British television show The X Factor. It premiered in Reykjavík on November 17, 2006, with actress Halla Vilhjálmsdóttir hosting the show. The judges were the talent agent and businessman Einar Bárðarson, rock musician Elínborg Halldórsdóttir and pop singer Paul Oscar. Previously, both Einar and Páll Óskar had been judges in Idol stjörnuleit, the Icelandic version of Pop Idol.

In the finals of X Factor held in Vetrargarðinum, Smáralind, a large shopping center in Iceland, singer and hair dresser Jógvan Hansen from Faroe Islands was the winner.

Contestants

Key:
 – Winner
 – Runner-up
 – Third place

Results summary
Colour key

References

Iceland
Television series by Fremantle (company)
2006 Icelandic television series debuts
2006 Icelandic television series endings
2000s Icelandic television series
Non-British television series based on British television series